Carl Wilhelm Theodor Schuster (born September 18, 1808 in Lüne-Moorfeld; died 1872) was a German jurist and physician. As a revolutionary, he was one of the prominent figures of the League of Outlaws, a utopian socialist organization of German émigrés in Paris.

Biography 
Starting in 1829, Schuster worked as an adjunct professor at the University of Göttingen where he had obtained his Doctor of Law degree the same year.

After his involvement with the constitutionalist movement in the Kingdom of Hanover and the 1831 Göttingen Riots he had to flee Germany, going first to Strassbourg and 1832 to Paris. He became a socialist and a follower of the Swiss-born liberal economist Jean Charles Léonard de Sismondi.

Schuster joined the League of Outlaws and became one of the League's leaders, editing its journal, The Outlaw, from 1835 on.  He gave financial aid to the German refugees in the 1840s.

References

German socialists
German revolutionaries
1808 births
1872 deaths